George McCarthy Craig (November 15, 1887 – April 23, 1911), nicknamed "Lefty", was an American Major League Baseball pitcher. He played for the Philadelphia Athletics during the  season. He was born in Philadelphia.

He appeared in just two games and posted a 10.80 earned run average without a decision in 1⅔ innings of work.

Craig died in Indianapolis, Indiana, at the age of 23 after being shot by a burglar.

Sources

Major League Baseball pitchers
Philadelphia Athletics players
Utica Pent-Ups players
Trenton Tigers players
Baseball players from Philadelphia
1887 births
1911 deaths
Deaths by firearm in Indiana
American murder victims
People murdered in Indiana
Male murder victims
1911 murders in the United States
Reading (minor league baseball) players